Adamsite or DM is an organic compound; technically, an arsenical diphenylaminechlorarsine, that can be used as a riot control agent. DM belongs to the group of chemical warfare agents known as vomiting agents or sneeze gases. First synthesized in Germany by Heinrich Otto Wieland in 1915, it was independently developed by the US chemist Roger Adams (for whom it is named) at the University of Illinois in 1918.

Composition
DM is an odourless crystalline compound with a very low vapour pressure. The colour of the crystals ranges from bright yellow to dark green depending on the purity. It is readily soluble in some organic solvents (e.g., acetone, dichloromethane), but nearly insoluble in water. In vaporous form it appears as a canary yellow smoke.

Effects
Adamsite is usually dispersed as an aerosol, making the upper respiratory tract the primary site of action. Although the effects are similar to those caused by typical riot control agents (e.g. CS), they are slower in onset but longer in duration, often lasting for 12 or more hours. After a latency period of 5–10 minutes irritation of the eyes, lungs and mucous membranes develops followed by headache, nausea and persistent vomiting.

Usage
DM was produced and stockpiled by the British and the United States at the end of World War I. It was used by the British during the incursions at Murmansk and Archangel. It is now regarded as obsolete and has been widely replaced by riot control agents such as CS which are less toxic and more rapid in the onset of symptoms. Early battlefield use was intended to be via "adamsite candles". These were large metal cans or tubes (weighing approximately ) which contained a smoke composition made of adamsite plus a slow burning pyrotechnic composition. A series of candles were lit and the adamsite-laden smoke allowed to drift towards the enemy.

In the United States, it was used against the Bonus Army who demonstrated in Washington, DC, in 1932, reportedly causing the death and serious injury of several children who had accompanied their parents on the protests. It was again used in the Vietnam War.

In 2003, North Korea was reportedly producing adamsite at its Aoji-ri Chemical Complex in Haksong-ri, Kyŏnghŭng county for stockpiling. DM was allegedly used by Venezuelan authorities in the 2014–17 Venezuelan protests and described as "green gas" with reports of protesters vomiting following exposure and regional human rights groups condemning the usage of "green gas", stating that its usage is "internationally banned".

References

External links
Adamsite in the NIOSH emergency response database
Case definition of adamsite poisoning (from the U.S. CDC)

Lachrymatory agents
Organoarsenic chlorides
Vomiting agents
Riot control agents
German inventions
Chemical weapons of the United States
United Kingdom chemical weapons program
Arsenic heterocycles
Nitrogen heterocycles
Arsenic(III) compounds